The 1983 Commonwealth Heads of Government Meeting was the seventh Meeting of the Heads of Government of the Commonwealth of Nations. It was held in New Delhi, India, between 23 and 29 November 1983, and was hosted by that country's Prime Minister, Indira Gandhi. The retreat was held in Goa. Discussions were held on three major topics – the American Invasion of Grenada, the occupation of Namibia by South African and Cuban troops and the nuclear rivalry between the United States and the Soviet Union.

See also
 7th Summit of the Non-Aligned Movement
 1887 Colonial Conference, first colonial conference
 1921 Imperial Conference, first conference to include India
 1926 Imperial Conference, issued the Balfour Declaration of 1926
 1930 Imperial Conference, issued the Statute of Westminster 1931, establishing effective legislative independence of Dominions of the British Empire
 1948 Commonwealth Prime Ministers' Conference, issued the London Declaration, establishing India as a republic in the Commonwealth
 British Empire Economic Conference, held to discuss the Great Depression
 January 1966 Commonwealth Prime Ministers' Conference, first meeting to be held outside of the United Kingdom
 2013 Commonwealth Heads of Government Meeting

References

1983
Diplomatic conferences in India
20th-century diplomatic conferences
1983 conferences
1983 in international relations
1983 in India
India and the Commonwealth of Nations
November 1983 events in Asia